is a river in Hokkaidō, Japan.

Course
The lake formed when the Akan River was dammed by an eruption of Mount Oakan some 6000 years ago. The river exits the lake at Takiguchi as a waterfall. This spot and Takimi Bridge nearby are attractions in Akan National Park.

The river winds its way south entirely within the district managed by Kushiro, Hokkaidō. The river then flows into the Pacific Ocean.

References

Rivers of Hokkaido
Rivers of Japan